Vadanamkurishi railway station  is a major railway station serving the town of Shoranur in the Palakkad district of Kerala. It lies in the Shoranur–Mangalore section of the Southern Railways.  Trains halting at the station connect the town to prominent cities in India such as Nilambur, Shoranur and Angadipuram.

Shoranur–Nilambur railway line
The Nilambur–Shoranur line is a branch line of the Southern Railway zone in Kerala state and one of the shortest broad-gauge railway lines in India. It is a single line with  length running from Shoranur Junction (in Palakkad district) to Nilambur railway station (in Malappuram district).  This station is 4 km from the town of Nilambur on the Kozhikode–Ooty highway. Shoranur–Nilambur Road passenger trains are running on this route.

References

Nilambur–Shoranur railway line
Palakkad railway division